Salvia appendiculata is a perennial plant that is native to Guangdong province in China, growing in forests, open streamsides, and thickets. Inflorescences are 4-6 flowered widely spaced verticillasters in racemes or panicles, with an  purple or dark red corolla.

Notes

appendiculata
Flora of China